The Two-Spot Dart (Eueretagrotis perattentus) is a moth of the family Noctuidae. It is found from coast to coast across central and southern Canada, and in the northern United States, south along the Appalachians to western North Carolina and Tennessee. There are a few scattered records along the Rocky Mountains from south-western Montana to south-eastern Arizona.

The wingspan is about 32 mm. Adults are on wing from June to July.

Larvae have been reared on Vaccinium and Prunus pennsylvanica.

External links
Bug Guide
The Noctuinae (Lepidoptera: Noctuidae) of Great Smoky Mountains National Park, U.S.A.

Noctuinae
Moths of North America